The 1987–88 BBL season was the first season of the British Basketball League (known as the Carlsberg League for sponsorship reasons), a breakaway competition formed by teams from the English National League and the Scottish National League. The season featured a total of 15 teams, playing 28 games each.

Portsmouth, reigning champions of the English League claimed the regular season title with a dominating campaign led by the likes of Alan Cunningham and Colin Irish. They weren't able to repeat their success in the post-season play-off's as third-seed Livingston, the reigning Scottish champions, caused a huge upset with an 81–72 win over Portsmouth in the final. Kingston won their fourth consecutive National Cup and Livingston claimed the inaugural BBL Trophy.

In the National League (the tier below the Carlsberg League) the Worthing Bears won the league with a 100% (18–0) record and in the play-off semi-final Billy Hungrecker scored a record 73 points in a 119–110 overtime win over Plymouth Raiders, before defeating Brixton TopCats in the final.

Carlsberg League (Tier 1)

Final standings

National League (Tier 2)

Final standings

Carlsberg League play-offs

Quarter-finals 
(1) Portsmouth vs. (8) Solent Stars

(2) Kingston vs. (7) Birmingham Bullets

(3) Livingston vs. (6) Bracknell Tigers

(4) Manchester United vs. (5) Calderdale Explorers

Semi-finals

Final

Prudential National Cup

Second round

Quarter-finals

Semi-finals

Final

NatWest Trophy

Group stage 
North Group 1
North Group 2
South Group 1
South Group 2

Semi-finals 
Calderdale Explorers vs. Livingston

Kingston vs. Portsmouth

Final

Seasonal awards 
 Most Valuable Player: Daryl Thomas (Hemel & Watford Royals)
 Coach of the Year: Gary Johnson (Calderdale Explorers)
 All-Star Team:
 Steve Bontrager (Kingston)
 Alan Cunningham (Portsmouth F.C.)
 Dan Davis (Kingston)
 Vic Flemming (Livingston)
 Marcus Gaither (Birmingham Bullets)
 Colin Irish (Portsmouth F.C.)
 Gary Johnson (Calderdale Explorers)
 Phil Smith (Solent Stars)
 Daryl Thomas (Hemel & Watford Royals)
 Clyde Vaughan (Leicester City Riders)

References 

British Basketball League seasons
1
British